Man Mohan Sood  (6 July 1939 – 19 January 2020) was an Indian cricketer. He was born in Lahore, and played in one Test in 1960. He played first-class cricket in India from 1957 to 1965.

Sood was a middle-order batsman. After top-scoring with 73 for the Indian Board President's XI against the touring Australians in late December 1959 he was selected for the Fourth Test two weeks later. Batting at number nine, he failed twice, and India lost by an innings. He made his only first-class century in 1960-61 when he scored a quick 170 for Delhi against Southern Punjab, adding 290 for the fifth wicket with Ramesh Saxena.

He was later a prominent cricket administrator in the Delhi & District Cricket Association, and served as a national selector in the 1980s.

References

External links
 
 Man Sood at CricketArchive

1939 births
2020 deaths
India Test cricketers
Indian cricketers
Delhi cricketers
Indian Universities cricketers
North Zone cricketers
Indian cricket administrators
Cricketers from Lahore
Cricketers from Delhi